Julian Venice and Dalmatia (Venezia Giulia e Dalmazia) refers to the province in the Kingdom of Italy during the interwar period that was composed of the Julian March, Zadar, and Lastovo as well as territorial claims on the remainder of Dalmatia held by Yugoslavia. The province was dissolved in 1941 during World War II, with Zadar and Lastovo joining Italian annexed territories of Dalmatia from Yugoslavia in the Governorate of Dalmatia.

References

1941 disestablishments
Kingdom of Italy (1861–1946)
History of Dalmatia